The 2021 TC America Series Powered by Skip Barber Racing School was the third season of the TC America Series. The season began on 5 March at Sonoma Raceway and ended on 17 October at Indianapolis Motor Speedway.

In a change from the 2020 series, the TCR class, already racing in several other North American series, left TC America. It was replaced by the one-make TCX class based on the BMW M2 CS Racing Cup that races as part of the Nürburgring Endurance Series.

Calendar
The final calendar was announced on 3 October 2020, featuring seven rounds. The round at Canadian Tire Motorsports Park was later canceled. In June, Sebring International Raceway was announced as the CTMP round's replacement.

Entry list
{|
|

Footnotes

Race results
Bold indicates overall winner.

Championship standings
Scoring system
Championship points are awarded for the first ten positions in each race. Entries are required to complete 75% of the winning car's race distance in order to be classified and earn points. Individual drivers are required to participate for a minimum of 25 minutes in order to earn championship points in any SprintX race.

Drivers' championship
{|
|

† Half points were awarded for both races at VIR after the two events completed less than 75% of the scheduled distance.

Teams' championship
{|
|

† Half points were awarded for both races at VIR after the two events completed less than 75% of the scheduled distance.

References

External links

TC